Aphelonyx kordestanica is a gall wasp species in the family Cynipidae whose life cycle involves only Palaearctic oaks, Quercus subgen. Quercus, in the section Cerris.

References

Further reading
Mutun, Serap, et al. "Four new species of Andricus Hartig oak gallwasp from Turkey (Hymenoptera: Cynipidae, Cynipini)." Zootaxa 3760.2 (2014): 241–259.
Azmaz, Musa, and Yusuf Katılmış. "FOUR NEW RECORDS OF OAK GALL WASP (HYMENOPTERA: CYNIPIDAE, CYNIPINI) FROM TURKEY." Munis Entomology & Zoology 10.1 (2015): 201–204.

Cynipidae
Gall-inducing insects
Insects described in 2010